The Haymarket Tragedy is a 1984 history book by Paul Avrich about the Haymarket affair and the resulting trial.

Among other books about the Haymarket affair, The New York Times wrote in 2006, Avrich's book compared as "a tour de force of archival research, clear narrative and probing analysis," especially on the history of American anarchism.

References

Further reading

External links 

 
 

1984 non-fiction books
American history books
History books about the United States
English-language books
Books by Paul Avrich
History books about anarchism
Princeton University Press books
Works about the Haymarket affair